The Myit Makha Media Group is an independent news agency in Myanmar. The company was formed in January  2008 and is based in Yangon. The chief editor is May Thingyan Hein, who received a 2007 Knight International Journalism Award.

Services
Myitmakha provides daily news to television channels, radio channels and local journals. Myitmakha's webpage was created in August 2011 for Myanmar audiences abroad. News for international audiences was launched in the English language in June 2012.

References

External links
Myitmakha Media Group website
Myitmakha Media Group website (English language)

Mass media companies established in 2008
News agencies based in Myanmar
Mass media in Yangon
2008 establishments in Myanmar